The 149th district of the Texas House of Representatives contains parts of Houston. The current Representative is Hubert Vo, who has represented the district since 2005.

References 

149

Texas elections